The 1878 Colorado gubernatorial election was held on October 1, 1878. Republican nominee Frederick Walker Pitkin defeated Democratic nominee William A. H. Loveland with 49.98% of the vote.

General election

Candidates
Major party candidates
Frederick Walker Pitkin, Republican
William A. H. Loveland, Democratic

Other candidates
R. G. Buckingham, Greenback

Results

References

1878
Colorado
Gubernatorial